The Bucium is a Romanian musical instrument; the term may also refer to several places in Romania:

Bucium, a neighbourhood in Iaşi, and one of the Seven hills of Iaşi
Bucium, Alba, a commune in Alba County
Bucium, a village in Șinca Commune, Brașov County
Bucium, a village in Ceica Commune, Bihor County
Bucium, a village in Orăștioara de Sus Commune, Hunedoara County
Bucium, a village in Valea Ursului Commune, Neamţ County
Buciumi (river), a tributary of the Cașin in Bacău County

See also
 Buciumeni (disambiguation)